Carbon Energy Limited (former name: Metex Resources Limited) is an Australian global energy technology provider and services company with expertise in unconventional syngas extraction utilising its proprietary Underground Coal Gasification (UCG) technology. It operates an underground coal gasification pilot plant at Bloodwood Creek, Queensland, Australia.  In 2009, Carbon Energy signed an agreement with the Chilean company Antofagasta Minerals to develop an underground coal gasification project in Mulpún, Chile. The Company is headquartered in Brisbane, Australia, is listed on the Australian Securities Exchange (ASX) as CNX and is quoted on the OTCQX International Exchange as CNXAY in the United States.

Carbon Energy has gone in to administration. The Australian government failed to act.

See also
 Coal mining in Chile
 Cougar Energy
 Linc Energy

References

External links

 Carbon Energy (Google Finance) 
 Carbon Energy Fact Sheet (Australian Stock Exchange website)

Coal companies of Australia
Natural gas companies of Australia
Companies based in Brisbane
Australian companies established in 2004
Energy companies established in 2004
Non-renewable resource companies established in 2004
Companies listed on the Australian Securities Exchange
Companies traded over-the-counter in the United States